Yemen
Events in Yemen
Yemeni culture
Society of Yemen
Holidays